Sir David Towry Piper CBE FSA FRSL (21 July 1918 – 29 December 1990) was a British museum curator and author.  He was director of the National Portrait Gallery 1964–1967, and of the Fitzwilliam Museum, Cambridge, 1967–1973; and Fellow of Christ's College, Cambridge, 1967–1973, and Director of the Ashmolean Museum, Oxford, 1973–85 and Fellow of Worcester College, Oxford, 1973–1985.  He was knighted in 1983.

The second of three sons of Stephen Harvey Piper, Professor of Physics at Bristol University, Piper was born at Wimbledon and educated at Clifton College and St Catharine's College, Cambridge (where he took an M.A.).

Piper was Slade Professor of Fine Art at the University of Oxford for 1966–67.

In 1956, Piper prepared a descriptive catalogue of the Petre family portraits at Ingatestone Hall for the Essex Record Office. He gave the 1968 Aspects of Art Lecture.

Under the pseudonym Peter Towry, Piper wrote a number of novels, including Trial by Battle (1959), a story based on his experiences as an officer in the Indian army, training in Bangalore and then seeing action against the Imperial Japanese Army in Malaya during World War II. He was subsequently a prisoner of war in Japan for three years.

In 1945, Piper married Anne Horatia (1920–2017), daughter of Oliffe Richmond, classics professor at Edinburgh University. She was a novelist and playwright. They had three daughters – Evanthe, Ruth, and Emma – and a son, theatre designer Tom Piper (born 1964).

Publications
His publications include:

As Peter Towry:

  (reprinted in 2019 by the Imperial War Museum but as by David Piper)

References

 R. J. B. Walker, 'Piper, Sir David Towry (1918–1990)', rev. Oxford Dictionary of National Biography, Oxford University Press, 2004; online edn, May 2007 accessed 5 March 2013
 

1918 births
1990 deaths
People from Wimbledon, London
People educated at Clifton College
English curators
British art curators
Directors of museums in the United Kingdom
Directors of the National Portrait Gallery, London
Fellows of the Society of Antiquaries of London
Fellows of the Royal Society of Literature
Fellows of Christ's College, Cambridge
Fellows of Worcester College, Oxford
Slade Professors of Fine Art (University of Oxford)
People associated with the Ashmolean Museum
Knights Bachelor
Commanders of the Order of the British Empire
20th-century British businesspeople